The Residences at The Ritz-Carlton is a luxury residential skyscraper in Center City in Philadelphia, Pennsylvania. At , the 48-story skyscraper is the twelfth-tallest building in Philadelphia, and the tallest residential tower in the city. The building was erected on the former site of One Meridian Plaza which was seriously damaged by a deadly fire in 1991. One Meridian Plaza was demolished in 1999 and the property was sold by E/R Partners to the Arden Group the next year. Development of the site by the Arden Group, which owns the adjacent Ritz-Carlton Philadelphia, was delayed for years as a result of a feud with rival developer Mariner Commercial Properties. Mariner owned the property 1441 Chestnut Street, which sits south of the Residences at The Ritz-Carlton site and intends to build its own residential tower. The feud began after Arden Group's lead partner Craig Spencer blocked approval of 1441 Chestnut Street because he felt the tower's design would be detrimental to the planned Residences at The Ritz-Carlton tower. This led to several years of dispute between the developers trying to block construction of each other's towers.

After several redesigns, the feud was declared over, and construction on the Residences at The Ritz-Carlton began on May 2, 2006. The blue glass skyscraper opened to residents in January 2009. The Residences at The Ritz-Carlton features 270 condominiums and penthouses, which range in price from US$550,000 to US$14 million. The high-rise also features an underground parking garage, a fitness center, a pool, and a private garden and public plaza called Girard Park.

History

The Residences at the Ritz-Carlton stands on the former site of the 38-story One Meridian Plaza. In February 1991, One Meridian Plaza was severely damaged by a fire that destroyed eight floors and killed three firefighters. Due to litigation over the fate of the burned skyscraper, it sat vacant for eight years until its demolition in 1999.

In 2000, the Arden Group settled with One Meridian Plaza's owners, E/R Partners, agreeing to pay more than US$13 million for the site. In 1999, Arden sued E/R Partners for backing out of a deal Arden said it had made with the site owners. E/R Partners had wanted to sell the site to Liberty Property Trust for a higher amount. Arden had already bought the adjacent Two Mellon Plaza, in 1993. Damaged and vacant since the One Meridian Plaza fire, Two Mellon Plaza was converted into a Ritz-Carlton hotel, in 2000. Adjacent to the south side of the One Meridian Plaza site is 1441 Chestnut Street. Mariner Commercial Properties, Inc. bought the property which contained the site of several three-story shops, and the eighteen-story Morris Building, all damaged and vacant due to the One Meridian Plaza fire. The buildings were demolished in 2000. The north side of the One Meridian plaza site faces Philadelphia City Hall, situated across the street. While the One Meridian Plaza was pending development, Arden converted it into an underground parking garage.

Feud

Looking for new headquarters; Comcast asked Arden Group and Mariner to work together and combine the properties into one building. By 2001, no agreement had been reached, and both developers had decided to move on with their own towers. As they sought to build competing condominium towers, the relationship between the two developers soon turned into a feud between the firm's lead partners, Craig Spencer of Arden Group and Tim Mahoney of Mariner. In 2003, Mahoney received permission from the City Zoning Board of Adjustment to build a 50-story residential tower at the 1441 Chestnut Street site. At the zoning hearing, Spencer attempted to block approval by saying the building was too tall and that it would damage his site by blocking views and casting shadows. Spencer filed a lawsuit to block construction of the building, and a Court of Common Pleas ruled that the Zoning Board erred in approving 1441 Chestnut Street. Mariner appealed the ruling.

In 2004, Spencer and Mahoney announced that the feud was over and that plans for both towers would move forward. The Residences at The Ritz-Carlton would be more than  taller than the skyscraper Spencer criticized as too tall in 2003. The feud quickly reignited when Mahoney criticized the design of The Residences at The Ritz-Carlton's lower floors. The bulky floors were designed to contain a grand ballroom, health club, and 540-car parking garage. Mahoney says the design would unnecessarily lower the values of the condominiums on 21 of the lower floors of his building. Further redesigns to both buildings prevented any condominiums from facing a garage. The feud continued with lively arguments to block each other plans in courtrooms and Philadelphia city agencies. Chairman of the zoning board, David L. Auspitz, called the feud the "Super Bowl of zoning battles".

In July 2005, Spencer announced a redesign of The Residences at The Ritz-Carlton shrinking the building from 57 floors to 44 floors. Among the facilities removed in the redesign were the ballroom and some of the parking. Afraid the high-rise would miss the city's hot condominium market, the redesign sidestepped the legal challenges because it would not need special approval by the Zoning Board to exceed a certain height. Mahoney vowed to continue fighting the building saying "If [Spencer] needs so much as a curb-cut permit, we're going to block it." In March 2009, Mahoney and Spencer reached an agreement that ended all legal challenges between the buildings. Now at 48 stories, The Residences at The Ritz-Carlton was far enough from Mahoney's 1441 Chestnut Street that 1441 Chestnut Street had views of Philadelphia City Hall, while the 58-story 1441 Chestnut Street upper portion was redesigned in a way that allowed views on the south side of The Residences at The Ritz-Carlton.

Construction
Construction began on May 2, 2006 with a ceremony that featured Pennsylvania Governor Ed Rendell. By September 2006 one-third of the buildings units had been sold. The Residences at The Ritz-Carlton was topped off in July 2008, and the high-rise opened for residents on January 13, 2009. The skyscraper was officially dedicated with a ceremony on June 8, 2009.

Building
The Residences at The Ritz-Carlton is a 48-story -tall residential skyscraper owned by the Arden Group and its partners Gencom Group and Colgate Development. Financed through Lehman Brothers and designed by Handel Architects the rectangular skyscraper is the tenth tallest building in Philadelphia and is the tallest residential tower in the city. The Residences at The Ritz-Carlton has a blue glass curtain wall and the east side of the building is pointed allowing views of Philadelphia City Hall. The condominiums and penthouses range in price from US$550,000 to US$14 million.

The building's amenities include hotel services, a fitness club, and a  lap pool. The lobby features a restaurant named 10 Arts owned by chef Eric Ripert, who also owns a condo in the building. Between The Residences at The Ritz-Carlton and the Ritz-Carlton Hotel is Girard Park. Girard Park is split into a gated garden for residents and a public space facing the street.  A memorial for the three firefighters who died during the One Meridian Plaza fire was unveiled on October 21, 2009. Designed by the Philadelphia Fire Department, the memorial is located by the building's entrance and contains the firefighters' names on plaques.

The Philadelphia Inquirer architecture critic Inga Saffron says the glass skyscraper is a "shocking" contrast next to the white marble of the Ritz-Carlton Hotel. Saffron said she liked the blue glass and that the "angled aluminum cap over the first floor is an especially sleek finish, and ties nicely into the aluminum bands that organize the facade into horizontals and verticals." Her negative opinions of the building included the public space of Girard Park which she describe as a "barren, virtually unusable piece of concrete".

See also
List of tallest buildings in Philadelphia

References

External links
The Residences at The Ritz-Carlton page
Emporis page
SkyscraperPage
Phillyskyline.com

Residential buildings completed in 2009
Residential condominiums in the United States
Residential skyscrapers in Philadelphia
Apartment buildings in Pennsylvania
Center City, Philadelphia